Pachyiulus varius is a species of millipede from Julidae family that can be found in Bulgaria, France, Greece, Italy, Romania, all states of former Yugoslavia and various European islands.

References

Julida
Animals described in 1781
Millipedes of Europe